"Baby's Got Her Blue Jeans On" is a song written by Bob McDill and recorded by American country music artist Mel McDaniel. It was released in October 1984 as the lead-off single from his album Let It Roll. It was a number-one hit on the U.S. Billboard Hot Country Songs chart in February 1985, and Mel McDaniel's only number-one single.

Background
Conway Twitty received the song but decided John Anderson's vocals were better suited for it, so he sent it to him. Not knowing who had sent him the song, Anderson turned it down. Mel McDaniel eventually received the song, and he recorded it.

Critical reception
Kip Kirby, of Billboard magazine reviewed the song favorably, calling it a "change of pace for McDaniel, who here ogles the national treasure alluded to in the title, while absolving the bearer of lascivious intent."

Covers
Sammy Kershaw covered this song on his 2006 album Honky Tonk Boots, where it was released as a single, although his version failed to chart. He also released a music video for his version.

Charts
"Baby's Got Her Blue Jeans On" debuted at number 75 on the U.S. Billboard Hot Country Singles for the week of November 10, 1984.

Weekly charts

Year-end charts

References

1984 singles
Mel McDaniel songs
Songs written by Bob McDill
Sammy Kershaw songs
Song recordings produced by Jerry Kennedy
Capitol Records Nashville singles
1984 songs